Nkana is a constituency of the National Assembly of Zambia. It covers the western part of the city of Kitwe in Kitwe District, including the city centre and the suburb of Nkana.

History
The constituency was established in 1938 and originally covered Kasempa, Mufulira, Mwinilunga, Nkana and Solwezi. In 1941 its borders were redrawn to cover only Chingola and Nkana. In 1948 it was reduced to covering only Kitwe.

List of MPs

References

Constituencies of the National Assembly of Zambia
1938 establishments in Northern Rhodesia
Constituencies established in 1938